The men's 400 metres hurdles event at the 1952 Summer Olympics took place July 20–21, 1952 at the Helsinki Olympic Stadium. There were 40 competitors from 24 nations. The maximum number of athletes per nation had been set at 3 since the 1930 Olympic Congress. The final was won by American Charles Moore. It was the nation's third consecutive and eighth overall victory in the event. The Soviet Union, in its debut, and New Zealand each earned their first medal in the men's 400 metres hurdles, with Yuriy Lituyev's silver and John Holland's bronze, respectively.

Background

This was the 10th time the event was held. It had been introduced along with the men's 200 metres hurdles in 1900, with the 200 being dropped after 1904 and the 400 being held through 1908 before being left off the 1912 programme. However, when the Olympics returned in 1920 after World War I, the men's 400 metres hurdles was back and would continue to be contested at every Games thereafter.

One of the six finalists from the 1948 Games returned: bronze medalist Rune Larsson of Sweden. The favorite was Charles Moore of the United States, the four-time AAU champion and the second man to run the race under 51 seconds. His biggest competition was expected to be Yuriy Lituyev of the Soviet Union.

Iceland, Luxembourg, Portugal, Puerto Rico, the Soviet Union, and Venezuela each made their debut in the event. The United States made its 10th appearance, the only nation to have competed at every edition of the event to that point.

Competition format

The competition expanded to a four-round format from the three-round format used since 1908: heats, quarterfinals, semifinals, and a final. Ten sets of hurdles were set on the course. The hurdles were 3 feet (91.5 centimetres) tall and were placed 35 metres apart beginning 45 metres from the starting line, resulting in a 40 metres home stretch after the last hurdle. The 400 metres track was standard.

There were 8 first-round heats of between 4 and 6 athletes each, with the top 3 hurdlers in each heat advancing to the quarterfinals. There were 4 quarterfinal heats with 6 athletes each. The top 3 men in each quarterfinal advanced to the semifinals. The 12 semifinalists were divided into 2 semifinals of 6 athletes each, with the top 3 in each semifinal advancing to the 6-man final.

Records

Prior to the competition, the existing world and Olympic records were as follows.

Charles Moore bettered the Olympic record with a time of 50.8 seconds in the first quarterfinal, then matched his own new record in the final.

Schedule

All times are Eastern European Summer Time (UTC+3)

Results

Heats

The first round was held on July 20. The three fastest runners from each heat qualified for the quarterfinals.

Heat 1

Heat 2

Heat 3

Heat 4

Heat 5

Heat 6

Heat 7

Heat 8

Quarterfinals

The quarterfinals were held on July 20. The three fastest runners from each heat qualified for the semifinals.

Quarterfinal 1

Quarterfinal 2

Quarterfinal 3

Quarterfinal 4

Semifinals

The semifinals were held on July 21. The three fastest runners from each heat qualified for the final.

Semifinal 1

Semifinal 2

Final

Results summary

References

Athletics at the 1952 Summer Olympics
400 metres hurdles at the Olympics
Men's events at the 1952 Summer Olympics